Dendropsophus luddeckei is a frog in the family Hylidae.  It is endemic to Colombia.  Scientists have seen it between 2000 and 4100 meters above sea level.

References

Endemic fauna of Colombia
Amphibians of Colombia
Amphibians described in 2012
luddeckei